Goran Bogdanović (born 27 April 1967) is a Serbian former footballer who played as a midfielder. He was most noted for his technical ability and dribbling skills.

Playing career
After starting out at his hometown club Smederevo, Bogdanović was acquired by Partizan as a teenager in 1985. He would go on to win back-to-back championships with the Crno-beli in 1986 and 1987. After completing his compulsory military service in the 1988–89 season, Bogdanović established himself as one of the team's most regular players, helping Partizan win the only edition of the Yugoslav Super Cup (1989) and one Yugoslav Cup (1992).

In February 1993, Bogdanović moved abroad to Spain and signed with Segunda División side Mallorca. He spent two and a half years with the Bermellones, before transferring to La Liga side Espanyol in the summer of 1995. In his debut season with the Periquitos, Bogdanović scored five league goals in 24 appearances, as the club finished in fourth place. He later lost his place in the team, before switching to Extremadura in early 1998, helping them win promotion to the top flight.

In January 2000, Bogdanović returned to his childhood club Sartid Smederevo. He helped the side earn a spot in UEFA competitions for the first time in the 2000–01 season. The following year, Bogdanović led the Oklopnici as captain to a third-place finish, their highest league position to date. He also helped them win the Serbia and Montenegro Cup in 2003, their first major trophy. At the end of the 2003–04 season, Bogdanović retired from professional football. He ended his career with a farewell exhibition game between his former clubs Smederevo and Partizan on 31 July 2004.

Post-playing career
Just weeks after hanging up his boots, Bogdanović was appointed as sporting director at his parent club Smederevo. He remained in charge until August 2012, before leaving the club following a disagreement with the newly appointed board.

Career statistics

Honours
Partizan
 Yugoslav First League: 1985–86, 1986–87
 Yugoslav Cup: 1991–92
 Yugoslav Super Cup: 1989
Sartid Smederevo
 Serbia and Montenegro Cup: 2002–03

References

External links
 
 
 
 

Association football midfielders
CF Extremadura footballers
Expatriate footballers in Spain
First League of Serbia and Montenegro players
FK Partizan players
FK Smederevo players
La Liga players
RCD Espanyol footballers
RCD Mallorca players
Segunda División players
Serbia and Montenegro expatriate footballers
Serbia and Montenegro expatriate sportspeople in Spain
Serbia and Montenegro footballers
Serbian footballers
Sportspeople from Smederevo
Yugoslav First League players
Yugoslav footballers
1967 births
Living people